Mazanderan TV (Mazanderani: تبرستون کانال meaning channel of Tapuria ) also Mazandaran Broadcast Network, is a local bilingual IRIB television channel, broadcast in the provinces of Mazanderan and Golestan, some parts of the Semnan and Gilan provinces of Iran, and the Balkan province of Turkmenistan.

History
Early establishment of an independent TV in Mazanderan goes back to the Pahlavi era, in 1971, the first broadcast was installed in the town of Sari, in 1975 television activity developed, and after the revolution of Iran, broadcasts were installed in other cities of Mazandaran (including Gorgan). Soon afterwards, Mazandaran TV Broadcast went on air available via an independent analogue frequency (VHF 36).

Mazanderani language
One of unique sections of this channel is programming in the Mazanderani language, Early movies shown on the channel were all dubs of foreign movies, including many which had not even been dubbed into Persian before. Currently, a selection of cultural programs, music programs, movies, and some serials are broadcast in the language. Additionally, the new manager of this channel who is proud for his Mazanderani heritage asks for publishing news into this language. During the presidency of President Ahmadinejad, most of its programs were published in Mazandarani.

Notable programs
Mahtou (Cultural program) 
Rowja (Academical program) 
Bemoni
Mazerooni Shoo (Cultural program)
Cheraghe Soo (Cultural program)
Hira (Cultural program)

Watching from air
Satellite: Intelsat 902 @ 62°E 
Channel Name: MazandaranTV
Frequency: 11067  
S/R: 3610 
POL: VER
FEC: 2/3
And
Satellite: Intelsat 902 @ 62°E 
Channel Name: MazandaranTV
Frequency: 10980 
S/R: 5300
POL: V
FEC: 3/4

External links

Islamic Republic of Iran Broadcasting
Television stations in Iran
Mazandaran Province
Golestan Province
Television channels and stations established in 1971